The 1992 Big East Conference baseball tournament was held at Muzzy Field in Bristol, Connecticut. This was the eighth annual Big East Conference baseball tournament. The fourth seeded  won their first tournament championship and claimed the Big East Conference's automatic bid to the 1992 NCAA Division I baseball tournament.

Format and seeding 
The Big East baseball tournament was a 4 team double elimination tournament in 1992. The top four teams were seeded one through four based on conference winning percentage only.

Bracket

Jack Kaiser Award 
Jim Foster was the winner of the 1992 Jack Kaiser Award. Foster was a catcher for Providence.

References 

Tournament
Big East Conference Baseball Tournament
Big East Conference baseball tournament
Big East Conference baseball tournament
College baseball tournaments in Connecticut
Bristol, Connecticut
Sports competitions in Hartford County, Connecticut